Naoto Fukasawa (born 1956) is a Japanese designer, author, and educator, working in the fields of product and furniture design. He is known for his product design work with the Japanese retail company Muji, as well as collaborations with companies such as Herman Miller, Alessi, B&B Italia, Emeco, Magis, and HAY.

Fukasawa has been described as one of the world's most influential designers.

Biography 
Fukasawa was born in Kōfu, Yamanashi Prefecture, Japan in 1956. He studied product design at Tama Art University graduating in 1980. After graduating, Fukasawa worked as a product developer at Seiko Epson until 1988, before joining the design firm ID Two, a predecessor to the design consulting firm IDEO in San Francisco, California, for whom he later established a Tokyo office in 1996. During this time he collaborated with the English industrial designer Sam Hecht. In 2002, Fukasawa became a MUJI advisory board member, and worked on the development of many of their products. After leaving IDEO, he established his own independent firm Naoto Fukasawa Design in 2003. In the same year, Fukasawa founded the "±0" (Plus Minus Zero) brand of household electrical appliances and household products, focused on the design of goods that are felt to be "just right". In recent years, he has several Italian furniture companies including B&B Italia, Driade, Magis, Artemide, Danese, and Boffi, as well several in Germany and Northern Europe.

He is one of the co-directors of 21 21 DESIGN SIGHT, Japan's first design museum. Since 2012, he has been the director of the Japan Folk Crafts Museum.

Since 2014, Fukasawa has taught Integrated Design at Tama Art University as a professor, and previously taught at Musashino Art University.

Many of his works are included in the permanent collection at the Museum of Modern Art (MoMA) including, MUJI's Wall-mounted Compact Disc Player (1999), Neon Cellular Phone by KDDI Corporation (2005), and Infobar Cellular Phone by KDDI Corporation (2003).

Design approach 

Naoto Fukasawa's design approach is centered around the relationship between design and behavior, using terms such as "design dissolving in behavior", "center of consciousness", "normality", "outline" and "archetype" to describe his work. His approach relies on observing how people act and react in their everyday, and finding solutions in these behaviors that link the design to the person. In his 2018 monograph, Fukasawa describes design as "attributing countenance to an object", in which the design is accompanied by the environment and the context.

Fukasawa coined the term "Without Thought" as a philosophy for how design can be found in people's unconscious behavior. Without Thought refers to how objects can feel important when seen for the first time, but only have their initial essence realized when being used. Ever since creating the term, Fukasawa has organized workshops to share his approach to other designers.

In 2006, Fukasawa curated the exhibition Super Normal together with English furniture designer Jasper Morrison to define "Super Normal", presenting 200 objects that were considered ordinary or to have been anonymously designed. Items presented in the exhibition ranged from notable objects such as the Bialetti espresso maker to anonymously designed and mass produced objects such as disposable plastic plates. The term defines objects as being absent of identity, originality, and elements that leave an impression, leading to objects that appear ordinary. This design concept can be seen reflected in Fukasawa's work with Muji, where products are created with an anti-branding approach of not presenting any traits that characterize the object.

Select awards 
Fukasawa has won over fifty awards, including the American IDEA Gold Award, the German iF Gold Award, the British D&AD Gold Award, the Mainichi Design Award and the 5th Oribe Award.

 1991 – IDEA Gold Award 
 1994 – Red Dot
 1996 – iF Gold Award
 2003 – Mainichi Design Prize
 2005 – 5th Oribe Award
 2007 – Royal Designer for Industry (Royal Society of Arts), in Product Design.
 2014 – Good Design award
 2018 – Isamu Noguchi Award

Select exhibitions 

 2006, Super Normal, curated by Jasper Morrison and Naoto Fukasawa at Axis Gallery, Tokyo, Japan
 2016–17, The Boundary between Kogei and Design at the 21st Century Museum of Contemporary art, Kanazawa

Works 
Naoto Fukasawa has consulted and designed for several companies, ranging from home appliance retailers to furniture manufacturers. Companies that he has designed for include:

Publications

Gallery

References

External links

 Naoto Fukasawa Design
NAOTO FUKASAWA DESIGN LTD. (naoto_fukasawa_design_ltd) - Instagram
±0 (PLUS MINUS ZERO) 
Naoto Fukasawa Furniture Designs
 Naoto Fukasawa - Interview
 Radio France International feature on Japanese design in the 21st century

1956 births
Living people
Japanese industrial designers
Product designers
Tama Art University alumni